Michael John Firth (1949 – 9 October 2016) was a New Zealand film director and writer.
Firth's first film, Off the Edge, was the first New Zealand feature to be Oscar-nominated.

Filmography

Film

Television

Awards
 1977 	Nominee for an Academy Award for Best Documentary Feature for Off the Edge (1976).

See also
List of New Zealand Academy Award winners and nominees

References

External links

1949 births
2016 deaths
New Zealand film directors